Syed Rashid Ali (born 1 January 1975) is a former Danish cricketer.

Ali played two matches for Denmark Under-19s against Bermuda Under-19s and Ireland Under-19s in Canada in 1991. He made his Lisr A debut for Denmark in English domestic cricket's 2005 Cheltenham & Gloucester Trophy against Northamptonshire at Svanholm Park, Brøndby. Opening the batting with Mickey Lund, Ali was dismissed for 8 runs by Charl Pietersen, one of his seven wickets, with Denmark being dismissed for just 56. Their first-class county opponents won the match by 8 wickets. Later in 2005, he was selected in Denmark's squad for the ICC Trophy in Ireland, with the matches in the tournament having List A status. He made four List A appearances during it, against Uganda, the United States, Bermuda and Ireland. Ali scored 32 runs in the tournament, at an average of 8.00, with a high score of 19. This was the last time he played for Denmark.

References

External links
Rashid Ali at ESPNcricinfo
Rashid Ali at CricketArchive

1975 births
Living people
Danish cricketers
Danish people of Pakistani descent
Sportspeople from Aarhus